Aliabad (also Romanized as ‘Alīābād; also known as ‘Alīābād-e Pā’īn and ‘Alīābād Pāīn Tūl) is a village in Kaftarak Rural District, in the Central District of Shiraz County, Fars Province, Iran. At the 2006 census, its population was 638, in 174 families.

References 

Populated places in Shiraz County